Al-Sudani may refer to:
 Al-Sudani (newspaper), Arabic newspaper in Khartoum, Sudan
Al-Sudani, a surname; notable people with the name include:
 Abdel Falah al-Sudani, Iraqi politician
 Bilal al-Sudani, (? - 2023), ISIS and Al Shabaab leader in Somalia
 Harith al-Sudani (?-2017), Iraqi spy against ISIS 
 Mohammed Shia' Al Sudani, Iraqi politician
 Yassir al-Sudani, military commander from Chechnya

See also 
 Sudanese (disambiguation)